The Rosställispitz is a mountain of the Silvretta Alps, located west of Susch in the canton of Graubünden. It lies between the valleys of Vereina and Fless, north-east of the Flüela Wisshorn.

References

External links
 Rosställispitz on Hikr

Mountains of the Alps
Mountains of Switzerland
Mountains of Graubünden
Zernez